Pieksänjärvi is a  medium-sized lake in Pieksämäki, Southern Savonia region in eastern Finland. It is situated in the Kymijoki main catchment area. It is located in the town of Pieksämäki.

See also
List of lakes in Finland

References

Lakes of Pieksämäki